Togo have appeared in the finals of the FIFA World Cup on one occasion in 2006.

FIFA World Cup record

Togo at Germany 2006

Squad

Group table

South Korea vs Togo
Mohamed Kader got the opening goal of the match and Togo's first ever goal at the World Cup Final's in the 31st minute when he controlled a ball over the top and ran into the right of the penalty area before shooting low with his right foot to the left and in off the base of the post past Lee Woon-jae.

Togo vs Switzerland

Togo vs France

Record players

Nine players have been fielded in all three of Togo's matches at the FIFA World Cup 2006, making them record World Cup players for their country:

Top goalscorers
The only goal for Togo at a FIFA World Cup was scored by Mohamed Kader in their 1–2 defeat against South Korea.

References

 
Countries at the FIFA World Cup
FIFA